Acraga ochracea is a moth in the family Dalceridae. It was described by Francis Walker in 1855. It is found in southern Brazil, Paraguay and northern Argentina.

The length of the forewings is 9–13 mm for males and 16–17 mm for females. Adults are on wing year round.

References

Moths described in 1855
Dalceridae